Theodore Lester "T. J." Beam (born August 28, 1980) is a former Major League Baseball relief pitcher and current pitching coach for the Ole Miss Rebels baseball team.

Professional career

New York Yankees
Beam made his major league debut for the New York Yankees on June 17, against the Washington Nationals at RFK Stadium in the bottom of the sixth inning. Beam pitched 1 and 1/3 of an inning giving up one home run, three hits, and one earned run. Beam's first career at bat resulted in a check swing strikeout by former Yankee relief pitcher Mike Stanton.

Beam won his first game on June 20, 2006, by pitching one-third of an inning, retiring the only batter he faced (Aaron Rowand), against the Philadelphia Phillies.

Beam was offered a new contract by the Yankees, declined, and became a free agent on December 12, .

Pittsburgh Pirates
On December 14, 2007, Beam signed a minor league contract with the Pittsburgh Pirates. Through September 4, Beam had a 3.89 ERA in 22 games. On August 19, 2008, Beam retired the final batter of the game to notch his only career save, nailing down a 4-1 Pirates victory over the Cardinals.

Toronto Blue Jays
On January 30, Beam was designated for assignment to create roster space for newly signed outfielder Eric Hinske. On February 5, he was claimed off waivers by the Toronto Blue Jays.

Arizona Diamondbacks
Beam was signed to a minor league contract which included an invitation to spring training by the Arizona Diamondbacks on December 4, 2009. He spent the season with Triple-A Reno, where he went 3–3 with a 6.33 ERA in 43 appearances with 5 saves, striking out 34 over 54 innings

Lancaster Barnstormers
Beam spent 2011 with the Lancaster Barnstormers of the Atlantic League. In 52 appearances, Beam went 3–3 with a 4.78 ERA with 1 save, striking out 40 in 49 innings.

Coaching career
Beam spent the 2013 season as the Ole Miss Rebels student assistant acting as a pitching coach. The Rebels pitching staff had a combined 3.07 ERA while striking out 432 over 557.2 innings.

References

External links

1980 births
Living people
Baseball players from Scottsdale, Arizona
Battle Creek Yankees players
Charleston RiverDogs players
Columbus Clippers players
Gigantes del Cibao players
American expatriate baseball players in the Dominican Republic
Grand Canyon Rafters players
Gulf Coast Yankees players
Indianapolis Indians players
Lancaster Barnstormers players
Las Vegas 51s players
Major League Baseball pitchers
New York Yankees players
Ole Miss Rebels baseball players
Peoria Saguaros players
Pittsburgh Pirates players
Reno Aces players
Scranton/Wilkes-Barre Yankees players
Staten Island Yankees players
Tampa Yankees players
Tiburones de La Guaira players
American expatriate baseball players in Venezuela
Trenton Thunder players
Scottsdale Fighting Artichokes baseball players